A list of Romanian politicians.

A

Slavoliub Adnagi
Gheorghe Alexandrescu
Nicolae Alexandri
Radu F. Alexandru
Gheorghe Alexianu
Dumitru Alimănișteanu
Elena Alistar
Andrei Volosevici
Roberta Anastase
Petre Andrei
Ștefan Andrei
Constantin Anton
Crin Antonescu
Ion Antonescu
Mihai Antonescu
Sorin Apostu
Constantin Argetoianu
Anton I. Arion
Constantin C. Arion
Costache Aristia
Apostol Arsache
Teodor Atanasiu

B

Vincențiu Babeș
Victor Babiuc
Anton Bacalbașa
Viorel Badea
Gaston Bienvenu Mboumba Bakabana
Radu Bălan
Alexandru Baltaga
John Ion Banu Muscel
Coriolan Băran
Eugen Barbu
Sulfina Barbu
Sava Barcianu-Popovici
Alexandru Bârlădeanu
Constantin Barozzi
Ion Bazac
Iulian Bădescu
Nicolae Bălcescu
Emanoil Băleanu
Ion Bănescu
Dan Barna
Simion Bărnuțiu
Petru Bașa
Traian Băsescu
George Becali
Eugen Bejinariu
Barbu Bellu
Octavian Bellu
Radu Berceanu
Dimitrie I. Berindei

Ana Birchall
Vasile Blaga
Nicolae Blaremberg
Anca Boagiu
Emil Boc
Sever Bocu
Marius Bodea
Sebastian Bodu
Constantin Boerescu
Vasile Boerescu
Alexandru Bogdan-Pitești
Vladimir Bogos
Ioan Boieriu
Matei Boilă
Dimitrie Bolintineanu
Ilie Bolojan
László Borbély
Valeriu Bordei
Constantin Bosianu
Nicolae Bosie-Codreanu
Constantin Boșcodeală
Ioan Gh. Botez
Ioan Botiș
Ștefan Botnarciuc
Martin Bottesch
Cristian Boureanu
Cornel Brahaș
Valeriu Braniște
Ion Constantin Brătianu
Constantin C. Brătianu
Dumitru Brătianu
Vintilă Brătianu
Caius Brediceanu
Coriolan Brediceanu
Eugen Brote
Silviu Brucan
Faust Brădescu
Constantin I.C. Brătianu
Gheorghe I. Brătianu
Ion I.C. Brătianu
Radu Budișteanu
Simion Bughici
Avram Bunaciu
Gheorghe Buruiană
Teodor Bârcă
Teodosie Bârcă
Gheorghe Băicoianu
Ion Bălăceanu

C

Nicolae Calimachi-Catargiu
Mircea Cancicov
Alexandru Cantacuzino (legionnaire)
Alexandru Cantacuzino (minister)
Gheorghe Grigore Cantacuzino
Ion C. Cantacuzino
Mihail Cantacuzino
Mihail G. Cantacuzino
Gheorghe Cantacuzino-Grănicerul
George P. Cantilli
Anton Caraiman
Dimitrie Cariagdi
Dan Cârlan
Anton Carp
Petre P. Carp
Barbu Catargiu
Lascăr Catargiu
Emanoil Catelly
Grigorie Cazacliu
Ion Cazacliu
Vladimir Cazacliu
Petru Cazacu
Ștefan Cazimir
Victor Cădere
Dimitrie Cărăuș
Radu Câmpeanu
Dan Nicolae Gheorghe Ceaușescu
Elena Ceaușescu
Nicolae Ceaușescu
Nicu Ceaușescu
Nicolae Cekerul Cuș
Sergiu Celac
Vasile Cepoi
Eugen Chebac
Mircea Chelaru
Vladimir Chiorescu
Afanasie Chiriac
Daniel Chițoiu
Tudor Chiuariu
Ion Ciocan
Silvia Ciornei
Adrian Cioroianu
Dimitrie N. Ciotori
Gheorghe Ciuhandu
Mugur Ciuvică
Constantin Coandă
Pavel Cocârlă
Corneliu Zelea Codreanu
Ion Codreanu
Codrin Ștefănescu
Mihail Coiciu
Dimitrie Comșa
Daniel Constantin
Constantin Al. (Atta) Constantinescu
Alexandru C. Constantinescu
Emil Constantinescu
Nicu Constantinescu
Petre Constantinescu-Iași
Grigore Constantinescu-Monteoru
George Copos
Dimitrie Cornea
Cornel Ceuca
Nicolae Corodeanu
Partenie Cosma
Gheorghe Costaforu
Teodor D. Costescu
Ioan E. Costinescu
Dimitrie Cozadini
Nichifor Crainic
Ion Creangă
Corina Crețu
Alexandru Crețescu
Gabriela Crețu
Victor Cristea
Vladimir Cristi
Gheorghe Cuciureanu
Dănuț Culețu
Sergiu Cunescu
Ovidiu Sorin Cupșa
Sabin Cutaș
Alexandru C. Cuza
Alexandru Ioan Cuza
Ion Câmpineanu
Florentin Cârpanu

D

Mihai Darie
Cristian David
Gavril Dejeu
Anghel Demetriescu
Gheorghe Derussi
Mircea Diaconu
Ene Dinga
Constantin G. Dissescu
Alexandru G. Djuvara
Gheorghe Dobre
Gheorghe Docan
Ioan Docan
Ștefan Augustin Doinaș
Panait Donici
Dimitrie Dragomir
Silviu Dragomir
Dimitrie Dron
Mircea Druc
Dumitru Drăghicescu
Ion Gheorghe Duca
Helmuth Duckadam
Felix Dudchievicz
Corina Dumitrescu
Nicolae Dumitru

E

Mayer Ebner
Péter Eckstein-Kovács
Eduard Eisenburger
Boris Epure
Manolache Costache Epureanu
Constantin Eraclide
Pantelimon Erhan
Constantin Esărescu

F

Gheorghe Falcă
Mihail Fărcășanu
Wilhelm Filderman
Petru Filip
Avram Filipaș
Grigore N. Filipescu
Nicolae Filipescu
Ioan C. Filitti
Ion I. Fințescu
Nicolae Fleva
Iancu Flondor
Nicu Flondor
Alexandru Florescu
Gheorghe Flutur
Ștefan Foriș
Richard Franasovici
Emilian Valentin Frâncu
Sorin Frunzăverde
Gheorghe Fulga

G

Grigore Gafencu
Vasile Gafencu
Simeon Galițchi
Camelia Gavrilă
Andrei Găină
Mircea Geoană
Costin Georgescu
Vasile Ghenzul
Vasile Gheorghian
Gheorghe Gheorghiu-Dej
Nicolae Gherassi
Onisifor Ghibu
Dimitrie Ghica
Ioan Grigore Ghica
Ion Ghica
Dimitrie Ghica-Comănești
Eugen Ghica-Comănești
Nicolae Ghica-Comănești
Radu Ghidău
Gheorghe Ghimpu
Dimitrie Gianni
Octavian Goga
Vasile Goldiș
Alexandru G. Golescu
Nicolae Golescu
Ștefan Gonata
Daniil Graur
Valeriu Graur
Ovidiu Grecea
Dimitrie Greceanu
Gheorghe Grigorovici
Alexandru Groapă
Cornel Grofșorean
Petru Groza
Grigore Grădișteanu
Ion C. Grădișteanu
Petru Grădișteanu
Octavian Guțu
Slavomir Gvozdenovici

H

Crin Halaicu
Pan Halippa
Spiru Haret
Bogdan Petriceicu Hasdeu
Puiu Hașotti
Ion Heliade-Rădulescu
Nicolae Hendea
Alexandru Hodoș
Iosif Hodoș
Constantin Hurmuzachi
Eudoxiu Hurmuzachi
Nicolae Hurmuzaki
Alexandru Hurmuzaki

I

Gheorghe Ialomițianu
Victor Iamandi
Constantin Iancu
Ioan Ianov
Vasile Iașinschi
Ion Ignatiuc
Ilie Ilașcu
Ion Iliescu
Ion Inculeț
Klaus Iohannis
Ion Andronescu
Teofil Ioncu
Constantin Dudu Ionescu
Nicolae Ionescu (publicist)
Take Ionescu
Mircea Ionescu-Quintus
Nicolae Iorga
Dimitrie Iov
Diana Iovanovici Șoșoacă
Nicolae Istrati
Ilariu Isvoranu

K
Mihail Kogălniceanu
Constantin A. Kretzulescu

L

Alexandru N. Lahovari
Iacob N. Lahovari
Ion N. Lahovari
Ion Lahovary
Stephen Bartlett Lakeman
Michel Landau
Leonida Lari
August Treboniu Laurian
Aurel Lazăr
Ilie Lazăr
Vasile Lașcu
Viorel Lis
Emil Lobonțiu
Vasile Luca

M

Ion Macovei
George Macovescu
Virgil Madgearu
Titu Maiorescu
Dumitru Man
Gheorghe Manu
Ioan Mang
Cassiu Maniu
Ioan Maniu
Iuliu Maniu
Mihail Manoilescu
Nicolae Manolescu
Mioara Mantale
Ionel Manțog
Ioan Manu
Șmil Marcovici
Gheorghe Mare
Alexandru Marghiloman
Béla Markó
Dimitrie Mârza
Gheorghe Gh. Mârzescu
Petre Mavrogheni
Radu Mazăre
Dumitru Mazilu
Nicolae Mămăligă
Constantin Meissner
Teodor Meleșcanu
Istrate Micescu
Mircea Miclea
Dimitrie Scarlat Miclescu
Mihai Bălășescu
Mihai David
Radu Mihai
Ion Mihalache
Eugen Mihăescu
Marian Petre Miluț
Mihail Minciună
Ion Mincu
Gheorghe Mironescu
Basile M. Missir
Nicolae Mișu
Ion Mitilineu
Miron Mitrea
Alexandru Mocioni
Andrei Mocioni
Ioan Mocsony-Stârcea
Valeriu Moldovan
Alexandru Moraru
Anatolie Moraru
George G. Moronescu
Vasile G. Morțun
Ion I. Moța
Ilie Motrescu
Ovidiu Ioan Muntean
Marian Munteanu
Iacob Mureșianu
Eftimie Murgu
Răzvan Mustea-Șerban

N

Grigore Nandriș
Gheorghe Năstas
Adrian Năstase
Ovidiu Natea
Alexandru Nazare
Teodor Neaga
Corneliu Neagoe
Robert Sorin Negoiță
Constantin Negruzzi
Dimitrie S. Nenițescu
Marius Nicoară
Diodor Nicoară
Nicolae Nemirschi
Nicolae Penescu
Sergiu Nicolaescu
Pompiliu Nicolau
Grigore Niculescu-Buzești
Oana Niculescu-Mizil
Constantin Niță
Constantin Năsturel-Herescu

O

Alexandru Odobescu
Bogdan Olteanu
Romeo Olteanu
Constantin P. Olănescu
Remus Opreanu
Marian Oprișan
Ioan Nicolae Opriș
Alexandru Orăscu
Leonard Orban
Ludovic Orban
Simion Oros
Ioan Ossian

P

Nicușor Păduraru
Ionel Palăr
George D. Pallade
Varujan Pambuccian
Ioan Pangal
Ermil A. Pangrati
Aurelian Pană
Victor Papacostea
Alexandru Papadopol-Calimah
Constantin Pârvulescu
Grigore Păucescu
Ana Pauker
Ion Pelivan
Ioan Gr. Periețeanu
Petre Logadi
Constantin Titel Petrescu
Nicolae Petrescu-Comnen
Ion Petrovici
Mihail Pherekyde
Cornel Pieptea
Gherman Pântea
Rovana Plumb
Gheorghe Pogea
Vasile Pogor
Victor Ponta
Gheorghe Pop de Băsești
Ștefan Cicio Pop
Teofil Pop
Ionuț Popa (politician)
Cristian Popescu Piedone
Dan Ioan Popescu
Ionuț Popescu
Irinel Popescu
Nicolae Vedea Popescu
Aurel Popovici
Dorimedont Popovici
Radu Portocală (politician)
Emanoil Porumbaru
Cristian Poteraș
Cristian Preda
Cătălin Predoiu
Grigore Preoteasa
Dragoș Protopopescu
Doru Pruteanu
Ion Păscăluță
Paula Pirvanescu

R

Nicolae Gr. Racoviță
Alexandru G. Radovici
Mihai Ralea
Alexandru Rațiu
Aurel Rădulescu
Augustin Rațiu
Ion Rațiu
Remus Kofler
Ladislau Ritli
Constantin Rolla
Alexandru Roman
Petre Roman
Valter Roman
Visarion Roman
Mihail Romniceanu
Constantin A. Rosetti
Radu R. Rosetti
Theodor Rosetti
Nicolae Rosetti-Bălănescu
Ion Rotaru
Ioan Rus
Gheorghe Ruset Roznovanu
Lothar Rădăceanu

S

    
Nicolae Sacară
Mihail Sadoveanu
Iuliu Șamșudan
Aureliu Emil Săndulescu
Constantin Sărățeanu
Ilie Sârbu
Petre Sălcudeanu
Stan Săraru
Bucur Șchiopu
Carol Schreter
Maria Schutz
George Scripcaru
Leon Sculy Logothetides
Dumitru Sechelariu
Gheorghe Seculici
Ștefan Șendrea
Codruţ Şereş
Timofei Silistaru
Horia Sima
George Simion
Elefterie Sinicliu
Victor Slăvescu
Nichita P. Smochină
Constantin Sofroni
Antonie Solomon
Alexandru Șoltoianu
Ulm Spineanu
Viorel Stanca
Gheorghe Bunea Stancu
Victor Atanasie Stănculescu
Rodica Stănoiu
Romeo Stavarache
Toma Stelian
Constantin Stere
Gheorghe Stere
George Sterian
Adolphe Stern
Alexandru B. Știrbei
George Barbu Știrbei
Barbu A. Știrbey
Alecsandru Știucă
Alex Mihai Stoenescu
Vasile Stoica
Constantin I. Stoicescu
Anastase Stolojan
Theodor Stolojan
Benno Straucher
Vasile Stroescu
Ioan Străjescu
Dimitrie A. Sturdza
Mihail R. Sturdza
Vasile Sturdza
Dimitrie C. Sturdza-Scheianu
Mircea V. Stănescu
Rodica Stănoiu
Eugeniu Stătescu
Aurel Suciu
Christodul J. Suliotis
Nicolae Suțu
Jenő Szász
Lörincz Széll
Lavinia Șandru
Codruț Șereș
Gheorghe Ștefan (politician)
Corneliu Șumuleanu

T

Gemil Tahsin
Ioan Taloș
Claudiu Târziu
Octavian C. Tăslăuanu
Gheorghe Tătărăscu
Gheorghe Tașcă
Alexandru Teriachiu
Răzvan Theodorescu
Alin Tișe
Nicolae Titulescu
Eugen Tomac
Mihai Toti
Grigore Trancu-Iași
Teo Trandafir
Grigore Triandafil
Valerian Trifa
Tudor Ionescu
Corneliu Vadim Tudor
Alexandru Raj Tunaru
Cătălin Septimiu Țurcaș
Grigore Turcuman
Adrian Turicu
Petre Țuțea
Edmond Tălmăcean
Gabriel Țepelea
Alexandru Tzigara-Samurcaș

U

Laurențiu Ulici
Teodor Uncu
Mihai Ungheanu
Mihai Răzvan Ungureanu
Traian Ungureanu
Ernest Urdăreanu
Alexandru Usatiuc-Bulgar

V

 Alexandru Vaida-Voevod
Darius Bogdan Vâlcov
Valerian Vreme
Marian Vanghelie
Alexandru Vericeanu
Dimitrie P. Vioreanu
Virgil Ioan Mănescu
Constantin Vișoianu
Andrei Vizanti
Mihail Vlădescu
Dan Voiculescu
Nicolae Voinov
Ștefan Voitec
Varujan Vosganian
Iulian Vrăbiescu
Mircea Vulcănescu
Ion Văluță

W
Alexandru Wassilko de Serecki
Eric Winterhalder

X
Nicolae Xenopol

Z

Dinu Zamfirescu
Ștefan Zăvoianu
Vitalie Zubac

 
 
Politicians
Romania